Steven Meese (born December 5, 1971, in Ioannina, Greece) is a Greek-American chef and television personality best known as the creator, host and producer of the PBS series, “A Chef's Journey.”

Food lines, culinary writings, cookbooks 
Meese writes about his food in the column, “Best Dish Forward” and a blog on his website. 
He currently is working on a cookbook on Mediterranean-style cuisine, entitled “My Mediterranean Kitchen.”

Early life 
Meese spent his early childhood in Greece until his family relocated to Daytona Beach, Florida, in the mid 1970s. He was inspired to begin cooking by his Greek family. He played in the U.S. Soccer League. Meese also had the opportunity to play in the English Premier League before his attention turned back to the kitchen.

Culinary events 
In 1995, Meese was accepted at the Disney Culinary Academy. He apprenticed under three-star Michelin chefs and was taught by chefs such as Darryl Mickler (as seen on “Discovery Channel’s Great Chefs of America,”), German chef Reimund Pitz, and Michael LaDuke, who has been a judge on Food Network Challenge "Food Network Star" and Iron Chef America. He traveled around the country learning his technique. Meese has attended James Beard Celebrity Chef dinners. Throughout his travels, Meese has worked alongside James Beard winners John Currence and Mike Lata, Grand Chef Colin Bedford and James Beard semi-finalist Scott Crawford. 
Chef Meese has cooked alongside Wolfgang Puck, Bobby Flay, Emeril Lagasse and some of the world's most respected chefs. 
Meese has worked in restaurant settings during his career. He has been the head and executive chef at several restaurants including Latitudes in Key West and Hilton Bizarre in Lake Worth, Florida,and the Diamond Players Club in Orlando.

PBS 
His PBS series A Chef's Journey aired on selective Midwest PBS stations from 2014 to 2016. In the series, Meese interviewed and cooked with some of the best chefs in the country including James Beard winner John Currence of City Grocery, Anthony Lamas of Seviche and Ryan McCaskey of Acadia.

Charity work 
Meese is also an ambassador for many charities including: No Kid Hungry, St. Jude's Children's Hospital and Charity: Water. In 2017, he was part of Chef's Table Austin, which is the largest fundraiser for Water to Thrive.

References

Living people
1968 births
Greek-American cuisine
American chefs
American male chefs
Greek chefs
Greek emigrants to the United States
Chefs from Florida
People from Daytona Beach, Florida